This is a chronological list of notable cases decided by the Supreme Court of Canada from the formation of the Court in 1875 to the retirement of Gérald Fauteux in 1973.

Note that the Privy Council heard appeals for criminal cases until 1933 and for civil cases until 1949. Also between 1888 and 1926, no criminal appeals were allowed to the Privy Council.

1875–99

19001949

19501959

19601969

1970–73

See also 
 List of Judicial Committee of the Privy Council cases
 List of notable Canadian Courts of Appeals cases

 (1867-1984)